Peter J. Schwendinger (born 27 April 1959 in Dornbirn, Austria) is an Austrian arachnologist.

He graduated from Innsbruck University in 1985, and in 1990 with a PhD, where he studied with Konrad Thaler. He was a lecturer at Innsbruck University, from 1989 to 1999. He taught at Chiang Mai University from 1996 to 1997.
He is a curator at the Natural History Museum of Geneva.
He is an editor of the journal Zootaxa.

Works
Peter J. Schwendinger and Jochen Martens, Journal of Arachnology, Vol. 30, No. 2, Proceedings of the 15th International Congress of Arachnology (2002), pp. 425–434

References

External links
 
 

Austrian arachnologists
1959 births
University of Innsbruck alumni
Academic staff of the University of Innsbruck
People from Dornbirn
Living people